Eva Grover is an Indian actress who has played supportive roles in numerous Hindi films and soap operas.

Filmography

Films

Television

References

External links
 

Living people
Actresses from Mumbai
21st-century Indian actresses
Indian film actresses
Actresses in Tamil cinema
Actresses in Hindi cinema
Actresses in Hindi television
Indian television actresses
Indian soap opera actresses
Year of birth missing (living people)
Actresses in Marathi cinema
Actresses in Marathi television
Actresses in Bhojpuri cinema